The HR Top 40 are the main Croatian domestic singles airplay chart, issued weekly by the Croatian Music Institute IHG (Institut Hrvatske Glazbe). The charts are a record of the most played domestic songs in various genres in Croatia. HR Top 40 became the official Croatian airplay chart in December 2012.

History
The chart launched on 24 January 2013 with the data collected from the 14th of January to the 20th of January being published in the first issue of the chart. Originally, the data from 80 radio stations was collected to form a list of the 40 most played domestic songs in Croatia. The airplay chart contained data generated by the Playkontrol system according to any song played during the period starting the previous Monday at time 00:00:00 and ending Sunday night at 23:59:59. Once a week, every Monday, the chart was published via the Croatian Music Institute's (IHG) official web page. The first number song was "Neopisivo" by Nina Badrić. Since July 2015 the chart is being is being published once a week, every Monday, through its official website. Two days prior, every Saturday, the chart is also being aired on its own show on the television channel RTL 2.. Since 2015 the data from more than 140 radio stations across the country is being collected to form the chart. In July 2015 6 regional charts started being published on a weekly basis with the main chart.

Compilation
There are five criteria points which are taken into consideration when forming the chart:
Only broadcasts from 6:00 in the morning to 01:00 after midnight are considered
When forming the chart, only broadcasts of entire recordings lasting longer than 2 and a half minutes are taken into account
All broadcasts from Monday to Sunday of each week are included
Only current singles are allowed to chart and a song can stay a maximum of 52 weeks (one year) on the chart
When generating the chart, the number of broadcasts (spins) are taken into account

Records
Current recorders of the chart are Vatra with song "Tango", which spent 25 consecutive weeks at number one, while Massimo Savić's song "Mali krug velikih ljudi" holds the record for most non-consecutive weeks at number one with a total of 30 weeks. Psihomodo Pop's "Donna" was the first song to which spend the maximum of 52 consecutive weeks on the chart. Savić's "Mali krug velikih ljudi" was the first song to spent a total od 30 weeks atop the chart and holds the record for most weeks at number one. Kornelija Petak was the youngest person to ever chart on the HR Top 40 chart, at the time when "Ja sam takva kava sam" debuted she was only 16 years old. Igor Delač holds the record for most consecutive number one singles; from Budan in 2018 to his latest single "Ne zaboravi" in 2022, a total of eights singles reached the top spot.

Song of the Year
Since 2014 at the end of the calendar year an award to the artist(s) of the most played song is being given out .

References

External links
 HR Top 40 Charts current week 
 Croatian Music Institute home page

Croatian music industry
Record charts